Gene Edward Brooks (June 21, 1931 – April 19, 2004) was a United States district judge of the United States District Court for the Southern District of Indiana.

Education and career

Born in Griffin, Indiana, Brooks received a Bachelor of Science degree from Indiana State University in 1953 and was a Lieutenant in the United States Marine Corps from 1953 to 1955. He received a Bachelor of Laws from Indiana University Maurer School of Law in 1958. He was in private practice in Mount Vernon, Indiana from 1958 to 1968. He was a prosecuting attorney of Mount Vernon from 1959 to 1968, and was a Referee in Bankruptcy for the Southern District of Indiana from 1968 to 1973. He became a United States Bankruptcy Judge for that district in 1973, holding that office until 1979.

Federal judicial service

On July 27, 1979, Brooks was nominated by President Jimmy Carter to a new seat on the United States District Court for the Southern District of Indiana, created by 92 Stat. 1629. He was confirmed by the United States Senate on October 4, 1979, and received his commission on October 5, 1979. He served as Chief Judge from 1987 to 1994. His service terminated due to his retirement on December 31, 1996.

Death

Brooks died on April 19, 2004, in Evansville, Indiana.

References

Sources
 

1931 births
2004 deaths
Indiana State University alumni
Indiana University Maurer School of Law alumni
Judges of the United States District Court for the Southern District of Indiana
United States district court judges appointed by Jimmy Carter
20th-century American judges
Military personnel from Indiana
United States Marine Corps officers
Indiana lawyers
Judges of the United States bankruptcy courts